Alfafara is a surname. Notable people with the surname include:

Epifanio Alfafara (1882–1933), Filipino writer
Sergio Alfafara (1920–?), Filipino writer